Roma Plastilina is a brand of non-hardening modeling clay sold by Spanish company JOVI and its subsidiaries.  JOVI Modeling Clay, Plastilina, is mainly composed of vegetable matter, making it lighter and giving 33% more volume. It is sold on the internet and in many arts and craft stores..

See also
 Plasticine

External links 
 Plastilina at jovi.es
 http://www.joviusa.com/

Sculpture materials
Craft materials

es:Plastilina